Oregon City, formerly Bloomingdale and Hengy, is a ghost town located between Oroville and Cherokee in Butte County, California. One of the first mining camps in the county, it was established in the autumn of 1848 by a party of Oregonians, who came to California over the Applegate and Lassen trails. Little more than a year later their captain, Peter H. Burnett, became the first civil Governor of California. For a time, Oregon City prospered as a gold mining and supply center, then it declined into virtual oblivion.

The Hengy post office operated from 1894 to 1900 and from 1901 to 1902; it was named after the first postmaster, Jessie Hengy. The Bloomingdale post office operated from 1902 to 1905.

The site of the camp is now a California Historical Landmark.

The Oregon City Covered Bridge, also known as the Castleberry Covered Bridge, is located near Oregon City.

External links

References 

Unincorporated communities in Butte County, California
Populated places in the Sierra Nevada (United States)
California Historical Landmarks
History of Butte County, California
Populated places established in 1848
1848 establishments in California
Unincorporated communities in California
Ghost towns in California